Jaafer Khalifah  Al-Saeed (born February 11, 1991) is a Saudi football player who plays as a defender for Al-Sharq.

References

1991 births
Living people
Saudi Arabian footballers
Al-Rawdhah Club players
Ettifaq FC players
Najran SC players
Al-Fayha FC players
Al-Kawkab FC players
Hajer FC players
Al-Sharq Club players
Al-Sadd FC (Saudi football club) players
Al Jeel Club players
Saudi First Division League players
Saudi Professional League players
Saudi Second Division players
Association football defenders
Saudi Arabian Shia Muslims
Place of birth missing (living people)